The Malindi–Bagamoyo Highway, also Coastline Transnational Highway, is a road in Kenya and Tanzania, connecting the cities of Malindi and Mombasa in Kenya to Tanga and Bagamoyo in Tanzania.

Location

Within Kenya

The road then continues south for  through the town of Lunga Lunga and onward to the nearby border with Tanzania, with this portion of the road designated officially as the entirety of route A14, an international trunk road.

Within Tanzania
From the border, the road will continue to Tanga, then on through Pangani before bypassing the Saadani National Park and ending at Bagamoyo. As of March 2019, this road in Tanzania was at the tendering stage.

Overview
The highway is expected to improve cross-border trade, tourism, socio-economic development and promote regional integration. The project is being handled directly by the East African Community. The road is also expected to ease the movement of traffic from both Mombasa and Tanga ports, destined for the land-locked countries of Uganda, Rwanda, Burundi, South Sudan and DR Congo.

Upgrade to double carriageway
The upgrade to class II bitumen and widening to double carriageway will be jointly funded by the European Union and African Development Bank. The construction cost is budgeted at US$751.3 million, with 70 percent borrowed from the AfDB, and each country funding 30 percent of the work in its territory.

In April 2018, the Business Daily Africa newspaper reported that construction delays on the Kenyan side were attributed to changes in road design from single carriageway to double carriageway, along a section of the highway.

Funding
In January 2020, The EastAfrican newspaper reported that the European Union had granted US$33.41 towards Kenya's expenses towards this project. As of November 2019, AfDB committed in writing to lend US$384.22 million towards this road infrastructure project.

See also
 List of roads in Kenya
 List of roads in Tanzania
 East African Community

References

External links
 Webpage of the East African Community
    Bagamoyo-Malindi highway construction starts next year

Roads in Kenya
Roads in Tanzania
Geography of Kenya
Geography of Tanzania
Transport in Kenya
Transport in Tanzania
East African Community